Mahendra Multiple Campus, Nepalgunj is a public co-educational institution located in  Nepalgunj city in western Nepal. It is one of the campuses affiliated to the Tribhuvan University.  It is named after the King Mahendra. 

It was renamed to Mahendra Degree College in 2018 BS and finally in 2028 BS, it was renamed to Mahendra Multiple Campus in 2028 BS based on the New Education Planning.

Infrastructures
The campus has 17 Bighas of land.  The infrastructures of the campus is considered to be in deteriorated state.

There are about 109 teachers and 65 administrative staffs in the campus.

References

Tribhuvan University
Buildings and structures in Banke District